Laurence William Mains  (born 16 February 1946) is a former rugby union footballer and coach who represented New Zealand. Mains' representative career started when he first played for Otago in 1967. He made his All Blacks début in 1971, against the British and Irish Lions. His last Test was against Ireland in 1976. Although he toured South Africa in 1976, he played no Test matches.

Mains' coaching career started with Otago, whom he coached for eight years. He was appointed All Blacks coach in 1992, and coached them to the 1995 Rugby World Cup final; where they lost to South Africa.

In the 1998 New Year Honours, Mains was appointed a Member of the New Zealand Order of Merit, for services to rugby.

He is the current owner of GJ Gardner Homes in Dunedin, New Zealand and is an oldboy of King's High School.

References

External links
 
 Laurie Mains' Opinion column at Rugby Heaven

1946 births
Living people
New Zealand international rugby union players
Members of the New Zealand Order of Merit
New Zealand rugby union coaches
New Zealand rugby union players
Rugby union fullbacks
New Zealand national rugby union team coaches
People educated at King's High School, Dunedin
Rugby union players from Dunedin